The Beechcraft Model 77 Skipper is a two-seat, fixed tricycle gear general aviation airplane, originally designed for flight training but also used for touring and personal flying.

Design and development
The Skipper was conceived with the design goals of creating a low cost primary trainer with an emphasis on ease of maintenance and low operating costs.

Design work on the Skipper began in 1974 as the PD 285, which made its maiden flight on February 6, 1975. The Skipper was Beechcraft's attempt to enter the two-place trainer market with an aircraft capable of competing with the popular Cessna 150 line of trainer aircraft. Though the aircraft first flew with a standard tail configuration, by the time it entered production, a T-tail configuration had been adopted, giving it an appearance very similar to its close competitor, the Piper PA-38 Tomahawk introduced in 1978.

Like the Cessna and Piper trainers which were its primary competition, the Skipper utilizes the Lycoming O-235 engine and features side-by-side configuration seating. Production was handled at the Liberal (Kansas) Division, where the Beechcraft Duchess and Musketeer were produced.

The Skipper wing utilizes a GA(W)-1 airfoil, specifically developed for low-speed aviation applications, based on 1970s NASA research. The aircraft was certified for intentional spins. While it is an all-metal design, the Skipper incorporated a number of innovative construction techniques, including tubular spars and aluminum honeycomb construction with metal-to-metal bonding, a technique inherited from the Musketeer family. The flaps and ailerons are actuated by torque tubes, rather than cables.

Operational history

The Skipper had the misfortune of being introduced at the beginning of a severe downturn in general aviation aircraft production in the United States. During its first year 1979, 47 were built, 140 in 1980, and 125 in 1981. Production stopped in 1983. A total of 312 aircraft were built.

Most of the production run was initially delivered to Beechcraft's flight school network, the Beech Aero Centers, where they were used as primary trainers.  A handful of Skippers are still in use as trainers.  Others are in the hands of private owners who use them as touring aircraft.

Specifications

See also

References
Notes

Bibliography
 "Airdata File: Beechcraft PD 285". Air Enthusiast, December 1975, Vol 9 No 6. p. 312.
 Taylor, John W. R. Jane's All The World's Aircraft 1980–81. London: Jane's Publishing Company, 1980. .
 Federal Aviation Administration, Rev 8.pdf Type certificate data sheet no. A30CE, Revision 8,  (November 27, 2017)

External links

 Beechcraft website

Skipper
1970s United States civil trainer aircraft
1970s United States civil utility aircraft
Single-engined tractor aircraft
Low-wing aircraft
T-tail aircraft
Aircraft first flown in 1978